Deping Road is a station on Line 6 of the Shanghai Metro. It began operation on December 29, 2007. There are a total of four exits in the station.

The station is located at the junction of Zhangyang Road and Deping Road, in Shanghai's Pudong New Area.

References 

Railway stations in Shanghai
Line 6, Shanghai Metro
Shanghai Metro stations in Pudong
Railway stations in China opened in 2007